Globsyn Business School (GBS) is a business school located in Kolkata, West Bengal, India. It was established in 2002 and offers 2-year full time Post Graduate Diploma in Management (PGDM) and Post Graduate Diploma in Management - Business Analytics (PGDM - Business Analytics), which are approved by All India Council for Technical Education (AICTE) and Master of Business Administration (Global) in partnership with Malaysia University of Science and Technology. Globsyn Business School is a part of AACSB International – The Association to Advance Collegiate Schools of Business - the world’s largest network of business schools and organizations focused on advancing

Vision 
To build an education edifice, where young men and women have freedom to excel, fulfill their career aspirations through a globally networked, corporate savvy, research driven management education system.

Mission 
To enable transformation of young minds to become responsible leaders with integrity through knowledge, innovation, research, technology and imbibe human values through care for society.

Core Values 

 Care for Society
 Responsible Leadership
 Innovation & Creativity
 Technology Adoption
 Lifelong Learning
 Research

Programmes 

 Post Graduate Diploma in Management (PGDM)
 Master of Business Administration (Global)
 Post Graduate Diploma in Management - Business Analytics (PGDM - Business Analytics)

Rankings and Recognitions 

 Globsyn Business School was recognised as the ‘Best Private B-School in Eastern India’ by The Times Group at Times Brand Icons 2022.
 Globsyn Business School has been ranked No. 1 Private B-School in Kolkata as per MBA Universe 2021.

Events 
Globsyn Business School organizes seminars, workshops and other events. Some notable events include:
 Globsyn Annual Lecture Series
 Globsyn Management Conference
 Serendipity
 Retrace
 Annual Convocation

References

External links
 

Business schools in Kolkata
2002  establishments in West Bengal
Educational institutions established in 2002